John B. Hick (1912 – after 1938) was an English footballer who played as a full back and left half. He made over 80 Football League appearances in the years before the Second World War.

Career
Hick was signed by Bristol City from Birmingham in August 1934, and made 84 League appearances for the club over five seasons. Hick moved to Ipswich Town in the summer of 1939, and played twice before the 1939–40 Football League season was abandoned on the outbreak of war.

References

1912 births
Footballers from Birmingham, West Midlands
English footballers
Association football fullbacks
Association football wing halves
Birmingham City F.C. players
Bristol City F.C. players
Ipswich Town F.C. players
English Football League players
Year of death missing